The Chushikoku Collegiate American Football Association (中四国学生アメリカンフットボール連盟) is an American college football league made up of colleges and universities primarily on the island of Shikoku; two schools are located in the Chūgoku region of Honshū.

Overview
The Chushikoku Collegiate American Football Association is the highest level of collegiate football in the island of Shikoku.

Member schools

Division 1

Division 2

League Champions

Heiwadai Bowl

The champion of the Chushikoku League plays in the Heiwadai Bowl against the champion of the Kyūshū Collegiate American Football Association in the West Japan playoff bracket.

External links
  (Japanese)

American football in Japan
American football leagues
College athletics conferences in Japan